Kalophrynus is a genus of microhylid frogs. It is the only genus in the subfamily Kalophryninae. The species in this genus are found in southern China, in Southeast Asia to Java and Philippines, and in Assam, India.

Species
There are 25 species:

References

 
Microhylidae
Amphibians of Asia
Amphibian genera
Taxa named by Johann Jakob von Tschudi